Alba Solís (born Ángela Herminia Lamberti; 18 October 1927 – 3 February 2016) was an Argentine singer, actress and vedette. Her style was characterized by singing tangos in a dramatic manner. She was born in the Floresta area of Buenos Aires to Italian parents, Oreste Juan Guillermo Lamberti and Herminia Trapanese.

Filmography
 Carne (1968)
 La cigarra está que arde (1967)
 Luna Park (1960)
 Estrellas de Buenos Aires (1956)
 Maleficio (1953)
 De turno con la muerte (1951)
 Escándalo nocturno (1951)

See also
 List of tango singers

References

External links
 

1927 births
Argentine vedettes
Singers from Buenos Aires
Tango dancers
Tango singers
2016 deaths
Argentine people of Italian descent
Burials at La Chacarita Cemetery